The tiger salamander (Ambystoma tigrinum) is a species of mole salamander and one of the largest terrestrial salamanders in North America.

Description

They are characterized by having markings varying in color on the back of their head, body, and tail. The coloring of these spots range from brownish yellow to greenish yellow, while the rest of their back is black or dark brown. They have short snouts, thick necks, strong legs, and lengthy tails. Their diet consists largely of small insects, snails, slugs, frogs, and worms, although it is not rare for an adult to turn cannibalistic and consume its own kind. Cannibalism in these salamanders can almost always be traced back to a large volume of competing predators and lack of prey in the area. If the opportunity presents itself, tiger salamanders will even feed on other smaller salamander species, lizards, snakelets (baby snakes), and newborn mice.

Illinois citizens voted for the eastern tiger salamander as state amphibian in 2004, and the legislature enacted it in 2005.

Habitat 
Tiger salamanders habitats range from woodlands crowded with conifer and deciduous trees to grassy open fields. These amphibians are secretive creatures who spend most of their lives underground in burrows, making them difficult to spot. One significant requirement these salamanders need to thrive is loose soil for burrowing. Tiger salamanders are almost entirely terrestrial as adults, and usually only return to the water to breed. The ideal breeding condition for tiger salamanders ranges from wetlands, such as cattle ponds and vernal pools, to flooded swamps. This species is most commonly found on the Atlantic coast from New York down to Florida. They are known, however, to be the widest ranging species of salamander in North America and have been found in smaller populations from coast to coast. Ambystoma tigrinum populations occurring in northern and eastern regions of the United States are thought to be native populations as evidence from a study uncovered the species in these regions seem to be from relict populations. The species which occur on the west coast of the United States are not necessarily native occurring to the region and occur as a result of introduction for sport fishing bait, which has resulted in hybridization.
Though tiger salamanders are not indicators of an ecosystem, they are good indicators of a healthy environment because they need good moist soil to burrow in. But pond disturbance, invasive fish, and road construction threaten the annual population.

Breeding 
Like all ambystomatids, they are extremely loyal to their birthplaces, and will travel long distances to reach them. However, a single tiger salamander has only a 50% chance of breeding more than once in its lifetime. In a study conducted in South Carolina, breeding migrations of adult tiger salamanders began in late October or November for males and November through February for females. The tiger salamander's ideal breeding period is somewhere between the late winter and early spring, once the ground is warm enough and the water is thawed. Males nudge a willing female to initiate mating, and then deposit a spermatophore on the lake bottom. About 48 hours after insemination, the female is ready to deposit her eggs in the breeding pool. One female can lay up to 25–30 eggs per egg mass. She carefully attaches the eggs to secure twigs, grass, and leaves at the bottom of the pool to ensure her eggs safety. In about 12–15 days time, the eggs will be fully hatched and ready to mature in the pool. It takes a tiger salamander approximately three months to reach full maturity and leave the breeding pool. Large-scale captive breeding of tiger salamanders has not been accomplished, for unknown reasons.

The larva is entirely aquatic, and is characterized by large external gills and a prominent caudal fin that originates just behind the head, similar to the Mexican axolotl. Limbs are fully developed within a short time of hatching. Some larvae, especially in seasonal pools and in the north, may metamorphose as soon as feasible. These are known as small morph adults. Other larvae, especially in ancestral pools and warmer climates, may not metamorphose until fully adult size. These large larvae are usually known as 'waterdogs', and are used extensively in the fishing bait and pet trades. Some populations may not metamorphose at all, and become sexually mature while in their larval form. These are the neotenes, and are particularly common where terrestrial conditions are poor.

Diseases 
Although immune themselves, tiger salamanders transmit Batrachochytrium dendrobatidis, which is a major worldwide threat to most frog species by causing the disease chytridiomycosis. Tiger salamanders also carry ranaviruses, which infect reptiles, amphibians, and fish. Using tiger salamander larvae as fishing bait appears to be a major source of exposure and transport to wild populations. Severe mortality of tiger salamander larvae sometimes occurs from recurring ranavirus infections.

Related species
The California tiger salamander (Ambystoma californiense) (listed at Vulnerable), the barred tiger salamander (A. mavortium), and the plateau tiger salamander (A. velasci) were all once considered subspecies of A. tigrinum, but are now considered separate species. Genetic studies made it necessary to break up the original A. tigrinum population, though some hybridization between groups occurs.

The California tiger salamander is now federally listed as an endangered species mostly due to habitat loss; however, very few studies have been performed on this species.

The axolotl is also a relative of the tiger salamander. Axolotls live in a paedomorphic state, retaining most characteristics of their larval stage for their entire lifespans. While they never metamorphose under natural conditions, metamorphosis can be induced in them, resulting in a form very similar to the plateau tiger salamander. This is not, however, their natural condition, and dramatically shortens their lifespan.

References

External links
 Project Tigrinum Florida

Mole salamanders
Amphibians of Canada
Amphibians of the United States
Fauna of the Great Lakes region (North America)
Fauna of the Eastern United States
Amphibians described in 1825
Extant Miocene first appearances
Symbols of Illinois
Articles containing video clips